Pelandaba is a suburb of Bulawayo in Zimbabwe. It has nearly 30,000 residents as of 2007. It houses Sizane Secondary School, Induba Primary School and the house of late Joshua Nkomo, the former leader of Zimbabwe's African Peoples Union.

Origins
The neighborhood was built in the 1950s as an "elite African community". J. H. Sobantu (who in the 1930s was "an emerging member of Southern Rhodesia's Westernized African elite"), was one of the chairmen of the residents' association. Its founding was the result of the boom in the Zimbabwe economy of the early 1950s, when the number of jobs as well as wages increased, a development from which Zimbabwe's black residents profited as well; moreover, labor unrests of the late 1940s showed the need for a more stable social situation. This led to a demand for better housing in better neighborhoods, and "both the government and employers began to pay more serious attention to the housing problems of urban blacks". Bulawayo, while opposing black landownership, "grudgingly introduced an African Home Ownership Scheme on a thirty-year leasehold basis". So, residents did not actually own the land on which they built "even the[ir] plushest houses": the 1930 Land Apportionment Act had reserved significant chunks of the country (the most fertile ones) to whites, including the white suburbs. The land on which Pelandaba (and the similar suburb Pumula) was built was leased from the city. The suburb proved successful enough in attracting the African elite (including such notables as Joshua Nkomo), and became "the trendiest black community in Bulawayo"; by 1957 its houses rivaled those of expensive white neighborhoods.

See also
Land reform in Zimbabwe

References

Suburbs of Bulawayo